Oreomunnea pterocarpa, known locally as gavilán or gavilán blanco, is a species of Oreomunnea in the family Juglandaceae. It is found in Costa Rica, southeastern Mexico (Chiapas), and Panama (Coclé Province).

It is a large tree growing to 35 m tall with a trunk up to 80 cm diameter. The leaves are pinnate, with four to eight leaflets each 6–20 cm long; unlike most genera in the Juglandaceae, the leaves are arranged in opposite pairs. The fruit is a small nut about 1 cm diameter, with a three-lobed wing, and a small fourth lobe at the base.

References

pterocarpa
Endangered plants
Taxonomy articles created by Polbot